East Malling railway station serves the village of East Malling in Kent, and is close to Ditton and Larkfield.

The station, and most trains serving it, are operated by Southeastern.

History
East Malling Halt opened in 1913. The station is at high level, adjacent to the railway bridge over the High Street, and the platforms are accessed by steps from street level: there are no lifts.
 Originally built of sleepers, the halt was rebuilt in concrete in the late 1950s. About a mile (1.6 km) east of the station, a siding served a small quarry in the 1930s. These had been removed by 1995.

The ticket office here closed by 1988; it was located in a wooden building on the up (London-bound) platform, where the part retained as a shelter continues in use. A PERTIS 'permit to travel' machine, located at road level at the foot of the steep staircase to the up platform, suffices. There is a metal shelter on the down platform, where extensive underpinning of the concrete platform took place in 2006. The platforms were extended in the late 1980s to take 8-car trains, having previously been of 6-car length only.

Services
All services at East Malling are operated by Southeastern using  and  EMUs.

The typical off-peak service in trains per hour is:

 1 tph to 
 1 tph to 

During the peak hours, the station is served by an additional hourly service between London Victoria and Ashford International, increasing the service to 2 tph in each direction.

References
References

Sources

External links

Tonbridge and Malling
Railway stations in Kent
DfT Category F2 stations
Former London, Chatham and Dover Railway stations
Railway stations in Great Britain opened in 1913
Railway stations served by Southeastern
1913 establishments in England